The England Coast Path is a proposed long-distance National Trail that will follow the coastline of England. When complete, it will be around  miles long.

The trail is being implemented by Natural England, a non-departmental public body of the UK government responsible for ensuring that England's natural environment is protected and improved. It also has a responsibility to help people enjoy, understand and access the natural environment. Although various National Trails already existed along England's coast, the first stretch of the official England Coast Path was opened at Weymouth Bay in Dorset in 2012.

In December 2014 the UK Government, encouraged by the success of the Wales Coast Path, announced that more than £5 million of additional funding was being committed over the following 5 years, to complete the Path by 2020, a decade earlier than would have otherwise been possible. 
In the UK public access to the foreshore, below the line marking high tide, has existed for a long time. The intertidal zone is generally deemed to be owned by the Crown although there are some exceptions. In England ownership of land extends only to the high water mark, and the Crown is deemed to own what lies below it.

Progress has slowed because of COVID-19 and because of a European court judgement in April 2018 regarding environmentally protected sites. Natural England now hopes to have all stretches approved and work underway by the end of 2021.

History

The final section of a long-distance coastal footpath running  around the southwest coast of England, through Somerset, Devon, Cornwall, Devon and Dorset (walking anti-clockwise) was designated as a National Trail in 1978. Sections were opened earlier: in Cornwall, 1973, South Devon and Dorset Paths, 1974, Exmoor Coast, 1975.

Before this, in Wales, the Pembrokeshire Coast Path had been opened in 1970. Following the establishment of the Pembrokeshire Coast National Park in 1952, Welsh naturalist and author Ronald Lockley surveyed a route around the coast. Lockley's report for the Countryside Commission in 1953 was welcomed and broadly adopted. Some sections of the walk were existing rights-of-way, but the majority were in private hands,  necessitating negotiation. Most landowners were in favour, and many benefitted from the erection of new fencing.  Even today, however, the path in places detours from the obvious line where landowners were unwilling to accept a new right-of-way across their land.

Right to roam
In 2000 the Government legislated to introduce a limited "right to roam". The Countryside and Rights of Way Act 2000 (CROW) was gradually implemented from 2000 onwards to give the general public the conditional right to walk in certain areas of the English and Welsh countryside, including coastal land. Developed land, gardens and certain other areas are specifically excluded from the right of access. Agricultural land is accessible if it falls within one of the categories described in the Act. People exercising the right of access have certain duties to respect other people's rights to manage the land, and to protect nature. The new rights were introduced region by region through England with completion in 2005. Maps showing accessible areas are published by Natural England.

Legal background

The England Coast Path has been possible because of the introduction of a UK law, the Right of Coastal Access under Part 9 of the Marine and Coastal Access Act 2009. The Act provides for the establishment of both the England Coast Path and, usually, the right of access over the associated ‘coastal margin’.

Natural England's Coastal Access Scheme was approved by the Secretary of State on 9 July 2013 under section 298(2) of the Marine and Coastal Access Act 2009, and presented to Parliament pursuant to section 298(6) of the Marine and Coastal Access Act 2009.

The first instance of this new law was implemented on a stretch of the English coast at Weymouth Bay on 29 June 2012.

This includes – where appropriate – any land, other than the trail itself, which forms part of the coastal margin and which has public rights of access along the way. This is known as ‘spreading room’. However, this does not include any right to enter private houses and gardens or Ministry of Defence land. The new right of Coastal Access also includes 'roll back', namely that if a section of coast erodes, the path will move back accordingly.

Existing coastal trails

Existing coastal trails in England will be incorporated into the England Coast Path.  There is, however, work to be done in upgrading and standardizing access and signage on these.

The following is a list of some of the existing coastal paths. Information about other paths can be found on the Long Distance Walkers Associations web page.

 Bournemouth Coast Path: 
 Cleveland Way: ; only part of the Cleveland Way is coastal. First proposed in the 1930s, a formal proposal was submitted in 1953. The trail was officially opened in 1969. It was the second official National Trail to be opened.
 Cumbria Coastal Way: 
Durham Coastal Footpath:  Passes through or close to Seaham Harbour, Dawdon, Easington, Dene Mouth, and Blackhall.
 Isle of Wight Coastal Path: 
 Lancashire Coastal Way: 
 Norfolk Coast Path: . It was opened in 1986 and covers the North Norfolk Coast AONB (Area of Outstanding Natural Beauty).
 The Northumberland Coast Path: .  Runs along the coast from Cresswell to Berwick-upon-Tweed, close to the Scottish border. It is part of the European North Sea Trail.
 Saxon Shore Way: . The Saxon Shore Way was originally opened in 1980, but has since been re-established, and in parts re-routed and extended.
 Solent Way: 
 South West Coast Path: . The final section of the path was designated as a National Trail in 1978.
 Suffolk Coast Path: 
 West Somerset Coast Path: . In March 2016 the path was extended to run from Brean Down to Minehead.

Work in progress

See the official website for the current situations: Natural England. Some right of way and foreshore access may already exist.

Linked trails

At the border with Wales it will link to the Wales Coast Path, which was fully opened on 5 May 2012, and comprises an  coastal walking route from Chepstow in the south to Queensferry in the north.
Offa's Dyke Path, a  non-coastal route, also links the England Coast Path at its Welsh border, largely following the line of the remnants of Offa's Dyke, fairly close to the boundary between England and Wales.
At Berwick-upon-Tweed the Northumberland Coast Path, part of the England Coast Path, connects with the Berwickshire Coastal Path, and thus with the proposed Scottish Coastal Way.
At Gretna, the path will connect with the Scottish Coastal Way, although the link between the Cumbria Coastal Way and Gretna has not yet been completed, and detailed planning for the Scottish Coastal Way between Gretna and the Mull of Galloway is still awaited.

Outline of the route
Natural England has divided the coast into 66 sections for planning purposes. The sections fall into five categories:
 England Coast Path and associated access rights now open
 Approved but not yet open
 Work in progress
 Estimated start 2016–17
 Estimated start 2017–18

The sections (working anti-clockwise round England from the southern end of the Welsh border and using Natural England's areas) comprise:

See also

The UK section runs from Dover to Plymouth (both ferry ports).
 Long-distance footpaths in the United Kingdom
 Scottish Coastal Way
 Wales Coast Path

References

External links
 England Coast Path: improving public access to the coast Natural England. Retrieved 20 January 2017
 England Coast Path National Trails. Retrieved 20 January 2017

Coastal paths in England
2014 establishments in England